This is a list of bridges in Hubei, China.

Bridges

Badong Yangtze River Bridge
Baishazhou Bridge
Changfeng (Wuhan) Bridge
E’dong Bridge
Ehuang Bridge
Erqi Bridge
Huanggang Yangtze River Bridge under construction
Huangshi Bridge
Jing Yang Bridge
Jingyue Bridge
Jingzhou Bridge
Jiujiang Bridge
Jiujiang Fuyin Expressway Bridge
Junshan Bridge
Longtanhe Bridge
Mashuihe River Viaduct
Nanlidu Bridge
Qing Jiang Bridge
Qingchuan Bridge
Second Wuhan Yangtze River Bridge
Shennongxi Highway Bridge under construction
Sidu River Bridge
Tianxingzhou Bridge
Tieluoping Bridge
Weijiazhou Bridge
Wuhan Yangtze River Bridge
Xiangfan Hanjiang Bridge under construction
Xiaohe River Bridge
Xiling Bridge
Yangluo Bridge
Yesanhe Bridge
Yichang Bridge
Yichang Railway Bridge
Yiling Bridge
Yingwuzhou Bridge
Yun Yang Hanjiang Bridge
Zhicheng Bridge
Zhijinghe River Bridge
Zigui Bridge

See also
List of bridges in China
Yangtze River bridges and tunnels

 
Hubei